The Helicom H-1 Commuter Jr is a single or two place homebuilt helicopter.

Design and development
The Commuter Jr uses a welded steel tube fuselage with a small forward fairing over the nose with a windscreen. It can seat two people in side-by-side configuration.

The rights to the Commuter I and II were sold to International Helicopters in 1970. Rights were sold again in 1980 with the company dissolving in 1981. The rights were purchased again in 1986 by Home Rotors Inc.

Variants
Helicom H-1 Commuter Jr
Helicom Commuter I
Helicom Commuter II
Designed in 1962, Used a  engine.
Helicom Duster
100 hp Continental-powered version with 23-foot rotors, rigged for cropdusting.
International Helicopters H-1 Commuter IA
Fiberglass cabin
International Helicopters H-1 Commuter IIB
Fiberglass cabin
Canadian Home Rotors Safari 
Heavily modified version by Canadian Home Rotors.

Survivors
One example (c/n 101, N17RS) named "Schmidt Commuter Helicom" is on display at the Planes of Fame Museum, Valle-Williams, AZ

Specifications (H-1 Commuter Jr)

See also
Hillman Hornet

References

Homebuilt aircraft